The Echo Park Avenue Line was a Pacific Electric streetcar line in Los Angeles. The railway traveled from 11th and Hill Streets in downtown Los Angeles along the Hollywood Line to Sunset Boulevard where it turned right and proceeded north along Echo Park Avenue to terminate at Cerro Gordo Street in the Echo Park neighborhood.

History
The route was opened as a horsecar line in 1889 under the Elysian Park Street Railway Company.

Pacific Electric designated the service with the number 32. At the time of the Great Merger of 1911, the line operated only as a shuttle on Echo Park Avenue between Sunset and Cerrito Gordo. Early the following year, the cars were continuing downtown to be through-routed with the Venice Boulevard Line. The inbound terminus was truncated to 9th and Hill in 1916. Between July and September 1926, the terminal was extended to 11th and Hill. Power issues in 1924 forced the route to again operate as a shuttle service on Echo Park between July and November. Through-routing to Venice continued starting in 1932 and persisted until 1950. Evening and Sunday service was converted to bus operations starting in 1939, but was reestablished in 1942 as a wartime measure. Service was reduced to a single franchise car on October 1, 1950, with full abandonment following on December 28.

See also
Streetcars in Los Angeles
Streetcar suburb
List of California railroads
History of rail transportation in California

References

Bibliography

External links

Electric Railway Historical Association of Southern California

History of Los Angeles
Light rail in California
Pacific Electric routes
Railway lines closed in 1950
Closed railway lines in the United States
Railway lines opened in 1889